The Oldenburg Class G1s were German steam locomotives procured by the Grand Duchy of Oldenburg State Railways (Großherzoglich Oldenburgische Staatseisenbahnen) from 1867 to 1877. They were intended to work both as tank engines as well as with a tender.

Design 
The G1 class were 0-4-0 locomotives, a configuration chosen for its simplicity and cheapness of construction. It had horizontal outside cylinders and a number of original design features, including a radially-stayed, round-top firebox and a small 'regulator box' that replaced the usual steam dome.

The locomotive frame was designed as a box with riveted steel plates that enabled it to double up as a feedwater tank, an arrangement known as the Krauss system. It had an Allan valve gear. The connecting and coupling rods were made of fluted I-section steel, the first time such a form had been used, although Belpaire in Belgium was developing the same idea, independently, at the time.

The first engine, Landwührden 
At the world exhibition in Paris in 1867 the first locomotive, named Landwührden (see table photo), won a gold  medal for excellence and design of workmanship. This engine - which was also the first one built by Georg Krauss of Munich and therefore had the works number 1 – was withdrawn from service in 1900 and may be viewed today in the Deutsches Museum in Munich. It is the only surviving locomotive from the Grand Duchy of Oldenburg State Railways.

Retirement 
Nineteen of the engines were to have been taken over by the Deutsche Reichsbahn as DRG Class 51.70, but this did not happen because by the time the final renumbering plan was drawn up in 1925, all the locomotives had been retired.

Importance 
According to Ransome-Wallis, "there is no doubt that this locomotive was, in many ways, an important 'landmark' in the history of locomotive development in Europe."

See also 
Grand Duchy of Oldenburg State Railways
List of Oldenburg locomotives and railbuses
Länderbahnen

Notes

References

Further reading 
 

0-4-0 locomotives
G 1
Railway locomotives introduced in 1867
Krauss locomotives
Standard gauge steam locomotives